Men's freestyle 55 kilograms competition at the 2008 Summer Olympics in Beijing, China, was held on August 19 at the China Agricultural University Gymnasium.

This freestyle wrestling competition consisted of a single-elimination tournament, with a repechage used to determine the winners of two bronze medals. The two finalists faced off for gold and silver medals. Each wrestler who lost to one of the two finalists moved into the repechage, culminating in a pair of bronze medal matches featuring the semifinal losers each facing the remaining repechage opponent from their half of the bracket.

Each bout consisted of up to three rounds, lasting two minutes apiece. The wrestler who scored more points in each round was the winner of that rounds; the bout finished when one wrestler had won two rounds (and thus the match).

Gold medal-winner Henry Cejudo would later leave the sport of wrestling to become a successful mixed martial artist in the UFC, simultaneously holding the world flyweight and bantamweight titles.

Schedule
All times are China Standard Time (UTC+08:00)

Results
Legend
F — Won by fall

Final

Top half

Bottom half

Repechage

Final standing

References 

 Competition format
Results Book, Page 26

Wrestling at the 2008 Summer Olympics
Men's events at the 2008 Summer Olympics